Frances Wickes (born Frances Gillespy, Lansingburgh, New York, August 28, 1875 – Peterborough, New Hampshire, May 5, 1967) was a psychologist and writer.

Biography

A graduate of Columbia University, Wickes was a teacher, writer and playwright for children and teenagers in New York but later became interested in becoming a Jungian therapist, especially for artists, and visited Zurich several times after meeting Carl Jung in 1920s, with whom Wickes maintained a correspondence.

Wickes kept a diary of dreams and made conferences, especially at the Analytical Psychology Club of New York. Wickes had a husband, Thomas Wickes (divorced in 1910 and died about 1947) and a son, Eliphalet Wickes (1906–1926). Wickes lived also in California and Alaska.

Jung wrote the preface to her second book on the psychological world of children (1927), where Wickes supported the autonomous presence of the child in the collective unconscious, according to the idea of a participation mystique, which Lucien Lévy-Bruhl in 1910 had theorized to exist within primitive societies, Wickes's comparing a child to an individual in training and giving more place to intuition and feeling than attention to the real or rational. The book was translated into German, French, Dutch, Italian and Greek.

In coming decades Wickes helped found Spring, which bills itself as the oldest Jungian journal, and lectured at various branches of the Jung Institutes.

Among Wickes's correspondents are preserved letters to Muriel Rukeyser (1913–1980), Henry Murray, Eudora Welty, Mary Louise Peebles (1833–1915), Martha Graham, Lewis Mumford, Thomas Mann, May Sarton, Robert Edmond Jones (1887–1954) and William McGuire (1917–2009). At death without heirs $1–1/2 million of her $2-million estate was given to the C. G. Jung Institute of San Francisco and the rest to the Frances G. Wickes Foundation (1955–1974).

Works

Non-fiction
 The Inner World of Childhood: A Study in Analytical Psychology, 1927; (with a preface Carl Jung) New York: D. Appleton and Co., 1931
 The Inner World of Man, with Psychological Drawings and Paintings. New York: Farrar & Rinehart, 1938
 The Inner World of Choice. New York: Harper and Row, 1963

Shorter pieces and fiction
 Stories to Act, 1915 
 "The Christmas Jest," A Child's Book of Holiday Plays, 1916 
 Child's Own Book of Verse, Vol. 1 and 2, 1917 (anthology of children's poetry compiled with Ada Maria Skinner) 
 Happy Holidays, illustrated by Gertrude A. Kay, 1921 
 Beyond the Rainbow Bridge, 1924
 A New Garden of Verses for Children, 1925 (ed. by Wickes) by Wilhelmina Seegmiller
 "Mother Spider," in A Child's Book of Country Stories, Ada M. Skinner and Eleanor L. Skinner (eds), 1925 
 "A Question," in Spring, 1941, pp. 107–109 
 Receive the Gale. A Novel. New York: D. Appleton-Century, 1946 
 "The Creative Process," in Spring, 1948, pp. 26–46 
 "The Conjure Wives" (link to audio), Stories to Dramatize, Winifred Ward (eds), Stories to Dramatize, 1952 
 Arrow Book of Ghost Stories, Nora Kramer (eds), 1960 
 "Wait Till Martin Comes In," Wilhelmina Harper (eds), Ghosts and Goblins: Halloween Stories for 1965

References

Sources
 Mary Esther Harding, "Obituary – Wickes, F.G." Journal of Analytical Psychology, XIII, 1, January 1968, pp. 67–69.
 Vincent Brome, Jung: Man and Myth, House of Stratus, 2001
 Deirdre Bair, Jung. A Biography, Boston: Little, Brown and Co., 2003. 
 "Frances G. Wickes Papers: A Finding Aid to the Collection in the Library of Congress", pg. 1, Pg. 2

1875 births
1967 deaths
American women psychologists
Jungian psychologists
20th-century American women writers
20th-century American non-fiction writers
American psychology writers
Teachers College, Columbia University alumni
People from Troy, New York
American women non-fiction writers